Berlin Station is an American drama television series created by Olen Steinhauer. The series stars Richard Armitage, Rhys Ifans, Leland Orser, Michelle Forbes,  Richard Jenkins, Keke Palmer, Ashley Judd, John Doman, Tamlyn Tomita, and Ismael Cruz Córdova. Bradford Winters had been showrunner for its first two seasons, with Jason Horwitch taking over for season 3.

A ten-episode first season premiered on Epix on October 16, 2016. On November 17, 2016, Epix renewed Berlin Station for a second season, originally planned to contain ten episodes, which premiered on October 15, 2017 and concluded a nine-episode-season-run on December 3, 2017. On December 6, 2017, Epix renewed the series for a third season, which premiered on December 2, 2018.

It was canceled on March 29, 2019 after three seasons.

In 2021, all three seasons were released on DVD from Paramount Home Entertainment.

Plot
The story follows Daniel Miller (Richard Armitage), who has just arrived at the CIA station in Berlin, Germany. In season 1, Miller has a clandestine mission: to uncover the source of a leak who has supplied information to a now-famous whistleblower named Thomas Shaw. Guided by veteran Hector DeJean (Rhys Ifans), Daniel learns to contend with the rough-and-tumble world of the field agent: agent-running, deception, and the dangers and moral compromises. In season 2, four months after Miller was shot at the end of season 1, he recovered from his injuries sufficiently to be given a new clandestine assignment: to infiltrate a far-right German political party believed to be planning an act of terror right before an upcoming election.

Cast

Main
 Richard Armitage as Daniel Miller, a cerebral CIA officer who shifts from working as an analyst at Langley headquarters in the USA to serving as an undercover officer in Berlin and is tasked with finding a leak in CIA operations
 Rhys Ifans as Hector DeJean, a disillusioned veteran CIA officer with dubious tactics and many secrets
 Leland Orser as Robert Kirsch, a devoted and successful Deputy Chief who digs intelligence out of the city of Berlin through a mix of force, diligence, and cleverness
 Michelle Forbes as Valerie Edwards, the no-nonsense administrator who serves as a Berlin Station Internal Branch Chief, and later Station Chief
 Richard Jenkins as Steven Frost (seasons 1–2, guest season 3), a veteran of the Cold War, who serves as the CIA's Chief of the Berlin Station in season 1 and is retired at the start of season 2
 Tamlyn Tomita as Sandra Abe (season 1), a quiet presence leading the efficient operation of Berlin Station while having an affair with her boss, Steven
 John Doman as Richard Hanes (season 2), the new American ambassador to Germany and an old friend of Steven's
 Keke Palmer as April Lewis (seasons 2–3), the new young case officer assigned to Berlin Station
 Ashley Judd as BB Yates (season 2, recurring season 3), Berlin's new Chief of Station, nicknamed "The Station Whisperer"
 Ismael Cruz Córdova as Rafael Torres (season 3), an officer for the Special Activities Center of the CIA, previously in the military

Recurring
 Mina Tander as Esther Krug, a German BfV agent and later the head of the BfV
 Mark Moses as Jason Wolfe, Berlin Station's supervisor at the CIA (seasons 1 and 3)

Season 1
  as Jemma Moore, Steven's superior at the CIA
 Caroline Goodall as Kelly Frost, Steven's wife
  as Hans Richter, an old-world spy who has risen to the highest ranks of the BfV
  as Julian De Vos, a courier funneling information from "Thomas Shaw" to Claudia Gartner
 Claudia Michelsen as Patricia Schwarz, Miller's cousin
 Antje Traue as Lana Vogel, aka "Joker", a freelance agent
  as Ingrid Hollander, a German reporter
 Zahra Ahmadi as Clare Itani, an American agent and DeJean's girlfriend
 Daniela Ziegler as Golda Friedman, a Mossad agent
 Sylvia Hoeks as Claudia Gartner, the courier between De Vos and Hollander

Season 2
 Thomas Kretschmann as Otto Ganz, a German alt-right extremist
 Emilia Schüle as Lena Ganz, Otto's daughter
 Natalia Wörner as Katerina Gerhardt, head of the alt-right party Perspektive für Deutschland (PfD, “perspective for Germany“)
 Heino Ferch as Joseph Emmerich, the #2 leader of the PfD
 Jannis Niewöhner as Armando, an undercover agent for the BfV
 Scott William Winters as Nick Fischer, a CIA agent
 Brandon Spink as Noah Kirsch, Robert Kirsch's son

Season 3
 Katarina Čas as Sofia Vesik, a controversial Estonian tech CEO
 Adi Kvetner as Rodion Volkov, a Russian Spetsnaz soldier working for Krik
 Julian Kostov as Sergei Basarov, a Russian Spetsnaz sniper aligned with Volkov
 Ladi Emeruwa as Dove Adeyemi, an asset that April is cultivating
 Robin Weigert as Jamie Hudson, Valerie's friend from college
 Anja Antonowicz as Nina Bartek, Kirsch's neighbor
 James Cromwell as Gilbert Dorn, a retired CIA agent revealing old secrets via podcast
 Robbie Gee as Kayode Adeyemi, Dove's scientist father
 Dejan Čukić as Kolya Akulov, the head of Russian Intelligence SVR
 Nikolai Kinski as Roman Platov, a Russian extremist working for Krik
 Mikhail Boutchine as Vassily Krik, a Russian oligarch

Episodes

Series overview

Season 1 (2016)

Season 2 (2017)

Season 3 (2018–19)

Production
Epix announced a ten-episode straight-to-series order on May 21, 2015. Michaël Roskam executive produced the series and directed the first two episodes. Olen Steinhauer wrote and executive produced the series. Production started in November 2015.

Principal photography took place in Potsdam at Studio Babelsberg, which is co-producer of Berlin Station. The whole interior of the CIA Station, which includes a security entrance as well as the big windowless office space within, was built on stages at Babelsberg's studios. Other scenes were shot on locations in Potsdam and Berlin, Germany.

On February 7, 2018, it was announced that Jason Horwitch would be joining the series as showrunner and executive producer. He will be replacing Brad Winters who had served in those positions for the show's first two seasons. For the third season, production moved to Budapest, Hungary.

Broadcast
A 10-episode first season of Berlin Station premiered on Epix on October 16, 2016. The series is exclusive to Netflix in Germany, Austria, Switzerland and Liechtenstein. It is broadcast free-to-air and on-demand in Australia on SBS TV. It also is available in Israel. The series has been licensed to more than 150 territories worldwide.

Reception
Berlin Station has received generally positive reviews from critics. On Metacritic, the show holds a rating of 65 out of 100, based on 12 critics, indicating "generally favorable reviews". In a season 1 review for Variety, Maureen Ryan attests the series "an outstanding cast that takes its reasonably solid storytelling and raises it a few notches through sheer talent and charisma", praising especially Richard Jenkins, Michelle Forbes and Rhys Ifans. The New York Times''' Mike Hale called season 3 a "well-made but not hugely original mix of spycraft, action and sexy office intrigue" and noticed that "Berlin Station'' is elevated by the surprising, and relatively unnoticed, quality of its core cast", mentioning particularly Leland Orser whose "shifty, nervous energy still carries the show".

References

External links

 
 
 

2016 American television series debuts
2019 American television series endings
2010s American drama television series
Espionage television series
English-language television shows
MGM+ original programming
Television shows set in Berlin
Television series by Anonymous Content
Television series by Paramount Television